Janice is an unincorporated community located in Perry County, Mississippi, United States. Janice is located within the Black Creek Wilderness portion of De Soto National Forest.

A post office operated under the name Janice from 1901 to 1915.

References

Unincorporated communities in Perry County, Mississippi
Unincorporated communities in Mississippi
Hattiesburg metropolitan area